Terry Mason (born 29 March 1943) is an Australian Paralympic athlete and weightlifter, who won two bronze medals at two Paralympics.

Biography
Mason grew up in the New South Wales town of Lithgow, and participated in several sports in the local area as a child and young adult, such as football, field hockey, swimming, athletics and wrestling. At the age of 26, he was injured in an accident resulting in him being in a wheelchair. After the accident, Jack Wilkinson encouraged him to become involved in wheelchair sports to maintain his physical fitness.

Two years after the accident, he was selected for the Australian team for the Commonwealth Paraplegic Games in Edinburgh, but did not attend the event. At the 1972 Heidelberg Games, he competed in athletics and weightlifting, winning a bronze medal in the Men's Pentathlon 3 event. At the 1974 Commonwealth Paraplegic Games in Dunedin, New Zealand, he won gold medals in weightlifting and the men's pentathlon. At the 1976 Toronto Games, he competed in athletics and weightlifting events, winning a bronze medal in the Men's Light-featherweight event.

He coaches and promotes wheelchair basketball in the Taree area. He assisted David Hall, a paralympic wheelchair gold medallist, early in his career. He is included in the list of Lithgow sporting champions .

References

External links
 

1943 births
Living people
Sportsmen from New South Wales
Paralympic athletes of Australia
Paralympic weightlifters of Australia
Paralympic bronze medalists for Australia
Paralympic medalists in athletics (track and field)
Paralympic medalists in weightlifting
Wheelchair category Paralympic competitors
Athletes (track and field) at the 1972 Summer Paralympics
Athletes (track and field) at the 1976 Summer Paralympics
Weightlifters at the 1972 Summer Paralympics
Weightlifters at the 1976 Summer Paralympics
Medalists at the 1972 Summer Paralympics
Medalists at the 1976 Summer Paralympics
People with paraplegia